DD Assam is a state-owned Indian TV channel. It telecasts from Doordarshan Kendra Assam, situated at Guwahati. DD Assam is available on DD Free dish DTH, at channel 52. Assam Doordarshan can reach almost 83% of the population and almost 79% the area.

History
In India, the first telecast was in 1965, with Aakashbani later. In 1976 it became independent as Doordarshan.  DD Assam 24 x 7 satellite channel was launched on 4 August 2020 by the then Minister of Information and Broadcasting Prakash Javadekar. It was done through video conferencing from New Delhi.

Regional News Unit (RNU) 
DD News has 31 functional Regional News Units / Bureaus which are broadcasting over 140 news bulletins in 22 languages/dialects with a consolidated more than 49 hours of daily telecast of bulletins and programmes. RNUs besides producing regional news also cater to DD News in Reporting, Visual feeds & Special Programming. All the States have a Regional News Unit (RNU), except Sikkim. Jammu and Kashmir has 2 RNUs, while there is one in Leh for Ladakh UT. Over 900 stringers are working for the DD News Network, across the country in all districts. RNU are headed by an Indian Information Service Officer (IIS) officer. He or she is responsible for functioning of the RNU including bulletins, budget / finance, coordination and other administrative issues.  News Editors are posted in RNU to mount the news bulletins / programmes, assignment coordination, social media handling, and to assist Head of RNU in the financial and administrative works.

RNU also engages the services of Reporters, Stringers, Camerapersons, Copy Editors, Assistant News Editors, Video Editors, Graphics Editors, News Readers, Website Assistants on casual assignments to mount the News Bulletins / Programmes.

Bulletin/News run by DD News Assam (RNU) 
The new daily news Timings are as follows :

Programming
News
Borgeet
Chah Gashar Maje Maje (Tea Garden Programme)
Geetmala
Krishi Darsan
Rupali Dhow

RNU Head and News Editor 

 Maruf Alam, IIS RNU Head and News Editor
 Santanu Rowmuria, IIS News Editor

See also
 List of programs broadcast by DD National
 All India Radio
 Ministry of Information and Broadcasting
 DD Direct Plus
 List of South Asian television channels by country

References

External links
 Doordarshan news site
 An article at PFC

Doordarshan
Foreign television channels broadcasting in the United Kingdom
Television channels and stations established in 1994
Indian direct broadcast satellite services
Mass media in Assam
Television stations in Guwahati
1994 establishments in Assam